Dumlupınar Stadium is a multi-purpose stadium in Kütahya, Turkey.  It is currently used mostly for football matches and is the home ground of Turkish Regional Amateur League team Kütahyaspor.

The stadium was built in 1938 and currently holds 11,495 people.

With the promotion of TKİ Tavşanlı Linyitspor to the Turkish TFF First League at the end of the 2009–2010 season, the stadium became their home ground.

References

External links

Football venues in Turkey
Multi-purpose stadiums in Turkey
Buildings and structures in Kütahya Province
Sports venues completed in 1938
1938 establishments in Turkey